Albert Ernest Zupek (January 12, 1922 – June 16, 1980) was a fullback in the National Football League who played for the Green Bay Packers.  Zupek played collegiate ball for Lawrence College, (now Lawrence University) before playing professionally for one season in 1946.  He retired that same season.

References

1922 births
1980 deaths
American football fullbacks
Green Bay Packers players
Lawrence Vikings football players
Sportspeople from Racine, Wisconsin
Players of American football from Wisconsin
Sportspeople from the Milwaukee metropolitan area